Douglas Darien Walker (born November 17, 1981) is an American film critic, comedian, actor, filmmaker, and YouTuber. Based in Chicago, Walker is best known for creating and starring in the satirical web series Nostalgia Critic, wherein Walker as the title character, a vulgar and childish nerd, reviews nostalgic films and other media in an often angry and profane manner. After an initial run on YouTube plagued by copyright claims due to his use of pre-existing clips, in 2008 Walker joined the website Channel Awesome (formerly That Guy With The Glasses), where he and the series gained enormous popularity and became the face of the site, eventually cultivating a community of other creators making similar content.

Early life
Walker is the son of Barney (born 1946), a naval officer and musician, and Sandra (née Polkow) Walker (1947–2016), a therapist. Both parents, as well as Walker's older brother Rob (born June 5, 1979), would later appear regularly in his videos. Due to his father's career, Walker was born on November 17, 1981, on a naval base in Naples, Italy, and moved frequently as a child, spending parts of his childhood in Rhode Island, Washington, and Jacksonville, Florida before moving to the Chicago, Illinois area in his teen years.

Doug Walker attended and graduated from Northern Illinois University, majoring in mass communication and minoring in visual art, also serving as an editor and cartoonist for the school newspaper.

He is a descendant of German composer Heinrich Schütz.

Nostalgia Critic

After graduating college, Walker worked as an illustrator and janitor to earn money, and started making videos on the then fairly new YouTube in his spare time. Although his early "Nostalgia Critic" videos were popular, Walker claims his rise to internet fame first came from the success of his "5 Second Movies" edits. Walker has stated that the Nostalgia Critic character is primarily inspired by Daffy Duck and the Queen of Hearts, as well as by comedians Lewis Black, Stephen Colbert, and Bill Murray. In 2008–2009, during the Great Recession, Walker moved his skits from YouTube to independent site That Guy With the Glasses, later renamed Channel Awesome, with videos hosted via Blip.tv. The majority of his skits have since been reuploaded to YouTube, and form a full web series spanning several seasons. Walker now works as a full-time content creator and staff member of Channel Awesome in Chicago, under the leadership of CEO Mike Michaud.

Walker's Nostalgia Critic character will at times compliment an actor in a film he views as otherwise bad and has been known at times to even get a personal response from actors and celebrities, most notably Mara Wilson, a former child actress who had appeared in two films that Walker criticized. In Walker's review of the film A Simple Wish, he surprised viewers with a guest appearance of the real Mara Wilson.

Criticisms and controversies

In 2015 and more extensively in 2018, numerous former Channel Awesome contributors and employees accused the company of widespread mismanagement and mistreatment, culminating in the Twitter hashtag #ChangeTheChannel and a Google Doc entitled "Not So Awesome" chronicling the complaints of over 20 contributors. While many of the allegations were directed at Michaud, former contributor Allison "Obscurus Lupa" Pregler, who had been critical of the site since leaving in 2015, said that Doug and Rob Walker were "complicit" and had failed to address complaints about Michaud's behavior. Another former contributor, Lindsay Ellis, described filming conditions on the Walker-directed Channel Awesome anniversary films as "grossly unprofessional", lacking film industry standards such as craft services and safety insurance; she also recalled the 2012 anniversary film To Boldly Flee, saying she had voiced discomfort to Walker about the sexualization of her character (a parody of the Star Trek character Seven of Nine, which she had not agreed to) and in one particular instance, after her and co-star Lewis "Linkara" Lovhaug objected to a perceived rape joke they were scripted to perform, Walker had merely "toned down" the scene in the final cut, and Ellis was later pressured by Walker to dub "comical sexual assault noises" for the scene during reshoots. This was corroborated by Pregler, who noted that "they didn't let anyone see the script until last minute", and Lovhaug, who said their concerns were "continually" dismissed. Following the allegations and several poorly received statements from Channel Awesome management, many contributors left the site, with only Walker, Brad Jones, and Larry "Guru Larry" Bundy Jr. remaining by the end of April.

Walker later acknowledged the controversy in a 2021 interview with Korey Coleman for Double Toasted, admitting that Channel Awesome had gotten "too big", resulting in poor communication among staff and producers, and that he had since been consciously trying to "keep everything closer and more personal".

Filmography

Film

Web

Discography

Singles

References

External links

 Official Channel Awesome website
 
 Official YouTube channel

1981 births
Living people
21st-century American comedians
21st-century American male actors
American film critics
American male comedians
American male film actors
American male web series actors
American YouTubers
American parodists
American comedy musicians
Parody musicians
Channel Awesome
Comedians from Illinois
Comedy YouTubers
Italian emigrants to the United States
Male actors from Chicago
Male actors from Naples
Micronational leaders
Northern Illinois University alumni
Writers from Chicago
Writers from Naples
YouTube channels launched in 2007
YouTube critics and reviewers